Resident (styled as resident) was an Austrian music magazine with a strong focus on the German-speaking drum-and-bass industry.

History and profile
The first issue was released in October 2005, which was accompanied by a drum-and-bass event in Vienna. Released quarterly, the magazine included a mix compact disc featuring a regional label or artist. The magazine's main idea was to promote the German and Austrian drum-and-bass industry.

The lineup featured more than fifteen acts, including internationally famous and not-yet-famous DJs, MCs and VJs.  Acts included:

 John B
 Syncopix
 Basstikal
 Shroombab
 MC SINISTA
 Splinta
 MC Davox

With a circulation of 2,000 copies, it was the highest circulation German-speaking drum-and-bass magazine worldwide. The final issue was dated 17 November 2008.

See also

 List of magazines in Austria
 List of music magazines
 Music of Austria

References

External links
  (in German), the magazine's official website

2005 establishments in Austria
2008 disestablishments in Austria
Dance music magazines
Defunct magazines published in Austria
German-language magazines
Magazines established in 2005
Magazines disestablished in 2008
Quarterly magazines
Austrian music
Drum and bass